Mim Mantasha (born 8 July 1996) is a Bangladeshi model, and the winner of Lux Channel I Superstar beauty pageant television reality in 2018.

Early life
Mim Mantasha was born on 8 July 1996 in Pabna, Rajshahi. Her father is a government worker and mother is a housewife. Mim also has a younger brother. She spent her childhood in Pabna and completed schooling from Adarsha Girls High School. She have completed her HSC from Pabna Government Womens College. After which she moved to Dhaka, Bangladesh to complete her graduation. 

She won the Lux Channel I Superstar beauty pageant television reality show that was held in 2018. Sarwat Azad Brishti and Samia Akter Othoi were also chosen as the first runner-up and second runner-up of this beauty pageant.

Credits

Television

 Shesh Vromon | ATN Bangla

Music Video
 Shob Kothar Ek Kotha

Telefilm
Roder Vitor Raat | Channel i TV
Onudhabon | Channel i TV
Pori | Channel i TV
Ebong Valobasha
 Kora Likar | Channel i TV
 Tume Acho Ame Achi | Channel i TV

Web series

References

External links

Living people
Reality television participants
People from Brahmanbaria district
Jahangirnagar University alumni
1996 births
Bengali television actresses
Bangladeshi female models
Bangladeshi actresses
People from Pabna District